IAM Cycling was a Swiss registered UCI WorldTour cycling team. It is managed by former French road race champion Serge Beucherie.
The title sponsor was IAM Independent Asset Management SA, a Swiss investment management company.

History

2013

The team was officially launched in January 2013. IAM Cycling is a member of the Mouvement pour un cyclisme crédible. IAM Cycling was selected as a wild-card entry for the 2013 Paris–Nice race.

2014

On 28 January it was announced that IAM Cycling had been granted a "wild card" entry to Tour de France 2014, its first Grand Tour. It also raced the Vuelta a España. Subsequently, in December 2014 the UCI announced that the team would be granted a WorldTour licence for the 2015 season.

2015

2016

In May 2016, the team announced they would fold at the end of the season due to not being able to secure a secondary sponsor.

Final roster (2016)

Major wins

2013
Overall  Tour Méditerranéen, Thomas Löfkvist
Stage 1 Circuit de la Sarthe, Matteo Pelucchi
Tour de Berne, Marcel Wyss
 Time Trial Championships, Matthias Brändle
Stage 5 Bayern Rundfahrt, Heinrich Haussler
 Time Trial Championships, Gustav Larsson
 Road Race Championships, Aleksejs Saramotins
Trofeo Matteotti, Sébastien Reichenbach
Overall  Tour du Limousin, Martin Elmiger
Stage 1, Martin Elmiger
Tour du Jura, Matthias Brändle
Tour du Doubs, Aleksejs Saramotins

2014
Stage 2 Tirreno–Adriatico, Matteo Pelucchi
Stage 3 Critérium International, Mathias Frank
Stage 3 Four Days of Dunkirk, Sylvain Chavanel
Tour de Berne, Matthias Brändle
Stage 1 Bayern Rundfahrt, Heinrich Haussler
Stage 2 Bayern Rundfahrt, Mathias Frank
 Time Trial Championships, Sylvain Chavanel
 Time Trial Championships, Matthias Brändle
 Road Race Championships, Martin Elmiger
Stage 2 Vuelta a Burgos, Matteo Pelucchi
Stage 5 (ITT) Vuelta a Burgos, Aleksejs Saramotins
Overall  Tour du Poitou-Charentes, Sylvain Chavanel
Stage 4 (ITT), Sylvain Chavanel
GP Ouest–France, Sylvain Chavanel
Stages 5 & 6 Tour of Britain, Matthias Brändle
Chrono des Nation, Sylvain Chavanel

2015
 Road Race Championships, Heinrich Haussler
Trofeo Santanyi-Ses Salines-Campos, Matteo Pelucchi
Trofeo Playa de Palma-Palma, Matteo Pelucchi
Stage 6 Tour of Oman, Matthias Brändle
Prologue Tour of Belgium, Matthias Brändle
Prologue Ster ZLM Toer, Roger Kluge
 Time Trial Championships, Jérôme Coppel
 Road Race Championships, Aleksejs Saramotins
Stage 1 Tour of Austria, Sondre Holst Enger
Stage 2 Tour of Austria, David Tanner
Stage 4 Tour de Wallonie, Jonas van Genechten
Stages 2 & 3 Tour de Pologne, Matteo Pelucchi

2016
Grand Prix d'Ouverture La Marseillaise, Dries Devenyns
Clásica de Almería, Leigh Howard
Overall  Étoile de Bessèges, Jérôme Coppel
Stage 5 (ITT), Jérôme Coppel
Stage 6 Tour of Croatia, Sondre Holst Enger
Stage 17 Giro d'Italia, Roger Kluge
Overall  Tour of Belgium, Dries Devenyns
Stage 2, Dries Devenyns
Stage 9 Tour de Suisse, Jarlinson Pantano
 Road Race Championships, Matthias Brändle
 Time Trial Championships, Matthias Brändle
 Road Race Championships, Jonathan Fumeaux
Stage 15 Tour de France, Jarlinson Pantano
 Overall Tour de Wallonie, Dries Devenyns
Stage 5, Dries Devenyns
Stage 7 Vuelta a España, Jonas van Genechten
Bretagne Classic Ouest–France, Oliver Naesen
Stage 16 Vuelta a España, Mathias Frank

Supplementary statistics

National champions

2013
 Austrian Time Trial Matthias Brändle
 Swedish Time Trial Gustav Larsson
 Latvian Road Race Aleksejs Saramotins 
2014
 French Time Trial Sylvain Chavanel
 Austrian Time Trial Matthias Brändle
 Swiss Road Race Martin Elmiger
2015
 Australian Road Race Heinrich Haussler
 French Time Trial Jérôme Coppel
 Latvian Road Race Aleksejs Saramotins 
2016
 Austrian Road Race Matthias Brändle
 Austrian Time Trial Matthias Brändle
 Swiss Road Race Jonathan Fumeaux

References

External links

 

 
Former UCI WorldTeams
Cycling teams established in 2013
Cycling teams disestablished in 2016
Cycling teams based in Switzerland
Defunct cycling teams based in Switzerland